Eteobalea pentagama is a moth in the  family Cosmopterigidae. It is found in Zimbabwe and South Africa.

References

Natural History Museum Lepidoptera generic names catalog

Eteobalea
Moths described in 1928